John "Johnny" Boxer is an Australian television and film actor and commercial voice-over best known for his role as Bobo Gigliotti in Pizza.

Early life
He grew up in Belmore, New South Wales and attended Belmore Boys High School, where he excelled in his studies as well as in athletics, cross-country, and water polo.

Career
Boxer worked as a brick layer at Bondi Pavilion before being spotted by casting agents at an Eastern Suburbs pub in the ‘80s. He has appeared in E Street, Pizza, Fat Pizza, Water Rats, Home and Away, and FINK! and has done voice-overs for various commercials, including for the Australian Cricket Team. He recently finished filming Smooth Criminal featuring fellow Australian actor Michael Bray.

Works

Filmography
2014 Son Of A Gun

Television
Water Rats (as Bouncer, S01E04 & as Commando #1, S04E20) (1996, 1999)
Pizza (as Bobo Gigliotti) (2000–2007)
The Potato Factory (as Hobart Trooper) (2000)
Home and Away (as Hoon, S13E12) (2000)
Pizza Live (as Bobo Gigliotti) (2004)
World Record Pizza (as Bobo Gigliotti) (2006)
The Da Vinci Cup (as Bobo Gigliotti) (2006)
Two Twisted (as Bill, S01E09) (2006)
Australian Families of Crime - Carl Williams: Baby Faced Killer (as Mick Gatto, S01E01) (2010)
Swift and Shift Couriers (as Bobo Gigliotti, S02E05) (2011)
Underbelly: Badness (2012)
Housos (as Bobo Gigliotti, S02E04) (2013)
Fat Pizza Back In Business (2019, 2021)

Stage
Pizza: The Stage Show (as Bobo Gigliotti) (2002)

References

External links
Official Myspace

Male actors from Sydney
Living people
1960 births
Australian people of Polish descent
Australian people of Italian descent